VSSC Central School is an English-medium co-educational public school located in the suburb of Thumba, in Thiruvananthapuram, in the Indian state of Kerala. The school offers programmes from grades 1–12. Admission is restricted to children of the employees of the Indian Space Research Organisation . It is a full-fledged senior secondary school, offering five streams at the +2 level with almost 1000 students and 60 staff members. It is affiliated to the Central Board of Secondary Education, New Delhi.

It was founded in 1976 with 28 students and four teachers to cater to the educational needs of the children of employees of the ISRO , residing in the ISRO staff quarters. Today, the school has a large campus with five interlinked blocks. There are more than 50 teaching staff, 10 non teaching and five office staff. The school has facilities which include a digital library, football, basketball and hockey courts, assembly and conference halls, 5 staff rooms, sports room, music and arts room, and offers yoga and table tennis facilities. The school also has an Indian Air Force National Cadet Corps squadron with over 50 cadets (affiliated to No.1 KER/AIR/SQN/NCC).

Organisation

VSSC Central School was established in 1976 with the purpose of providing quality education to the children of employees working in the Indian Space Research Organisation's Vikram Sarabhai Space Centre. The School witnessed its inception in a Type II Quarter of the VSSC Housing Colony with 4 teachers and 28 students in classes I to V. Ever since, it has grown steadily, with the school now having around 600 students studying in the school from classes from I-XII aided by 60 staff members. The current campus of the school is in the VSSC Housing Colony, with a sprawling campus that has five interlinked blocks with an auditorium and multiple playgrounds and sports facilities. The day-to-day activities of The school are managed and taken care of by the Principal, assisted by the Vice-Principal. The School is currently operated under the aegis of The Department of Space, Government of India.

Courses

The school is affiliated to The Central Board of Secondary Education, New Delhi. The first 10 years of education leads to the All India Senior Secondary School Examination ( AISSE ) and the following 2 years lead to the All India Senior School Certificate Examination ( AISSCE ). The first batch of seniors taking the AISSE graduated in 1982 whereas those taking the AISSCE graduated in 1989.

Information
 Classes: Standard I to Standard XII
 Second languages: Hindi, Malayalam and Sanskrit
 Houses: Subhash, Tagore, Ashok, Raman 
 Song: Shanti Mantra
 Sports: cricket, football, badminton, table tennis, hockey and basketball
 Annual Publication : Antariksh

Notes and references

External links

1976 establishments in Kerala
Educational institutions established in 1976
Private schools in Thiruvananthapuram